Minudasht, also Romanized as Mīnūdasht and Mīnū Dasht) is a city and capital of Minudasht County in Golestan Province, in northern Iran.  At the 2006 census, its population was 25,983, in 6,472 families.

References

Populated places in Minudasht County

Cities in Golestan Province